Cathy King (born September 3, 1959), formerly Cathy Borst (Cathy's married name was Borst - when she divorced she went back to her maiden name of King) is a Canadian curler from St. Albert, Alberta. She is a former Canadian champion skip and world championship bronze medallist, and 2013 world senior champion.

Curling career 
King was a national junior champion in 1977 and 1978, before there was a women's world junior championship. In 1988, she played for Alberta at the Canadian Mixed Curling Championship, losing in the final. She has been in seven Scotties Tournament of Hearts (1995, 1997, 1998, 1999, 2002, 2005, and 2006). She won the 1998 Scott Tournament of Hearts, and then won a Bronze Medal at the subsequent World Championships behind Elisabet Gustafson's team from Sweden and Helena Blach Lavrsen's team from Denmark.

King won the 2005 Alberta Tournament of Hearts, defeating the defending champion Shannon Kleibrink rink in the final, 5–4. At the 2005 Scott Tournament of Hearts, she finished with a 6-5 round-robin record, then lost in a tie-breaker to Ontario's Jenn Hanna. In 2006, King won the Canada Cup of Curling defeating Jennifer Jones in the final. King won her second straight provincial title in 2006, defeating the Renée Sonnenberg rink in the final, 8–2.  The sent King to the Tournament of Hearts in 2006, where she finished 6-5 again, and out of the playoffs. She has been part of three Olympic Curling Trials in 1997, 2001, 2005, and the pre-trials in 2009, but has never gone on to win.

King, along with Raylene Rocque retired from women's curling following the 2009-10 curling season. However, King returned the next season at the senior level. In her second season at the senior level, she represented Alberta at the 2012 Canadian Senior Curling Championships. She won the event, and became the first skip to win a Canadian Junior, Women's and Seniors championship in her career.

King was named to the Canadian Curling Hall of Fame in 2013. That year she also won the World Senior Curling Championship, going undefeated through the event. In addition her third Carolyn Morris became the first curler to win world championships for two different countries; she skipped Scotland to the senior women's title in 2005, one of four times she played for Scotland in the event before returning to Canada.

Personal life 
Cathy's partner is Bruce Saville, an Edmonton entrepreneur and philanthropist, for whom her club is named.  She has 3 sons from her marriage to Henk Borst.  Cathy's older brothers, Robbie and Chris, are former Canadian Junior Curling champions from the 1970s. She is a graduate of the Northern Alberta Institute of Technology.

Grand Slam record

Former events

References

External links
 

1959 births
Living people
Canadian women curlers
Canadian women's curling champions
Canada Cup (curling) participants
Curlers from Alberta
Northern Alberta Institute of Technology alumni
Sportspeople from St. Albert, Alberta
Curlers from Winnipeg